Suely in the Sky (also known as Love for Sale) is a 2006 Brazilian drama film directed by Karim Aïnouz.

Plot
Hermila was born and raised in the small town in northeastern Brazil. To earn money she adopts the pseudonym Suely, and offers herself in a raffle. The winner will have what she calls "A Night in Paradise."

Cast 
Hermila Guedes as Hermila/Suely
Maria Menezes as Maria
Zezita Matos as Zezita
João Miguel as João
Georgina Castro as Georgina
Cláudio Jaborandy as Cláudio
Marcélia Cartaxo as Marcélia
Matheus Vieira as Matheus
Flávio Bauraqui as receptionist

References

External links 

2006 drama films
2006 films
Best Picture APCA Award winners
Films directed by Karim Aïnouz
Brazilian drama films